The electoral district of West Launceston, sometimes referred to as Launceston West, was a single-member electoral district of the Tasmanian House of Assembly. It was based in the western suburbs of Launceston, Tasmania's second city.

The seat was created in a redistribution ahead of the 1903 state election, and was abolished when the Tasmanian parliament adopted the Hare-Clark electoral model in 1909.

Members for West Launceston

References
 
 
 Parliament of Tasmania (2006). The Parliament of Tasmania from 1956

Launceston West